The Bills of Exchange Act 1882 is a United Kingdom Act of Parliament concerning bills of exchange.  The Act was drafted by Sir Mackenzie Chalmers, who later drafted the Sale of Goods Act 1893 and the Marine Insurance Act 1906.

Bills of exchange are widely used to finance trade and, when discounted with a financial institution, to obtain credit.

The formal legal definition of a bill of exchange is as follows:
An unconditional order in writing addressed by one person to another, signed by the person giving it, requiring the person to whom it is addressed to pay on demand or at a fixed or determinable future time a sum certain in money to order or to bearer.

Expressing this in less formal language, it is a written order from one party (the drawer) to another (the drawee) to pay a specified sum on demand or on a specified date to the drawer or to a third party specified by the drawer.

Contents
Section 3 requires that bills of exchange be written and signed in order to be enforceable.

Judicial consideration
Cases which have considered the application of the Bills of Exchange Act 1882 include:
 Smith v Lloyds TSB Group plc [2001] QB 541

See also
English contract law

Notes

English contract law
1882 in England
1882 in Wales
Acts of the Parliament of the United Kingdom concerning England and Wales